Cherkasov (masculine) or Cherkasova (feminine) is a Russian surname. It may refer to:
Alla Cherkasova (born 1989), Ukrainian wrestler 
Alan Cherkasov, Kazakh television personality
Andrei Cherkasov (born 1970), former professional tennis player
Kirill Cherkasov, Member of State Duma, and agricultural committee deputy chairman
Maria Cherkasova (born 1938), Russian journalist and ecologist
Marina Cherkasova (born 1964), Russian retired pair skater
Marina Cherkasova (skier) (born 1972), Russian freestyle skier 
Nikolai Cherkasov (1903–1966), Soviet actor
Svetlana Cherkasova (born 1978), Russian middle-distance runner
Valentina Cherkasova (born 1958), Soviet sports shooter
Veronika Cherkasova (1959–2004), Belarusian journalist

References

Russian-language surnames